Jacqueline Acheampong (born 16 December 1999), known professionally as Gyakie, is a Ghanaian R&B and afro-fusion singer. In 2019, Gyakie released her first single titled "Love is Pretty", which paved the way for another single, "Never Like This". In August 2020, the "Forever" song from her five-track EP "Seed" was her claim to fame, enjoying airplay and leading charts in Ghana, Kenya and Nigeria. Gyakie's father is Nana Acheampong.

Early life and education 
Gyakie was raised in Kumasi in the Ashanti Region of Ghana. She graduated from T.I. Ahmadiyya Senior High School, Kumasi and completed her undergraduate studies at Kwame Nkrumah University of Science and Technology (KNUST) where she majored in  International business.

Career 
Gyakie was born into a family of musicians and by age eight, she had started joining her father in the studio. She was also influenced by Asa and Ghanaian musician Omar Sterling of R2Bees.

Gyakie released her first single; "Love is Pretty" in February 2019 and preceded to release, "Never Like This." She released a five-track EP, titled Seed in August 2020. The "Forever" track on the Seed EP enjoyed airplay in Ghana, Kenya and Nigeria.  It topped music charts such as Billboard's Top Triller Global and Shazams Top 200 charts. Gyakie released a remix of "Forever" with Nigerian singer Omah Lay in March 2021. In that same month she was adjudged the emerging woman of the year at the 2021 3Music Women's Brunch for the 3Music Awards 2021.

She has signed an international record deal with Sony Music entertainment, RCA Records UK and Sony Music Africa.

In March 2022, Gyakie was adjudged the Woman of the Year for the 3Music Awards 2022 during the 3Music Women's brunch.

In June 2022, Gyakie got featured on Grammys Herbal tea and white sofas interview, a new series where artists reveal their backstage must-haves. 

She released her second EP dubbed ''MY DIARY" in July, 2022,. The EP features Nigerian musician Davido.

Discography

Albums and EPs
SEED (EP) (2020)
MY DIARY EP(2022)

Singles
Love is Pretty (2019)
Never Like This (2019)
Sor Mi Mu feat Bisa Kdei (2020)
Forever Remix feat Omah Lay (2021)
 Vacation
 Whine
 Follow You Fiokee, Chike & Gyakie (2021)
 Something (2022)
Featured on

 Sheege D-Black ft. Gyakie (2021)
 Right Here Blaq Jerzee ft Gyakie (2021)
 Like This Serge Ibaka, Diplo & Gyakie
 Paradise AKA, Musa Keys & Gyakie (2022)
 Need Your Love R2Bees ft. Gyakie (2022)
 Sika Bisa Kdei ft. Gyakie

Awards and nominations

References

Ghanaian Afrobeat musicians
Ghanaian women musicians
Living people
People from Kumasi
T.I. Ahmadiyya Senior High School (Kumasi) alumni
1998 births
Kwame Nkrumah University of Science and Technology alumni